Bogdan Laurentiu Otavă (born  in Bucharest) is a Romanian bobsledder.

Otavă competed at the 2014 Winter Olympics for Romania. He teamed with driver Andreas Neagu, Paul Muntean, Florin Cezar Crăciun and Dănuț Moldovan in the four-man event, finishing 24th. Otavă was a replacement for the third run only.

As of April 2014, his best showing at the World Championships is 16th, coming in the four-man event in 2012.

Otavă made his World Cup debut in January 2011. As of April 2014, his best finish is 11th, in a four-man event in 2011-12 at Whistler.

References

1987 births
Living people
Olympic bobsledders of Romania
Sportspeople from Bucharest
Bobsledders at the 2014 Winter Olympics
Romanian male bobsledders